St Patrick's Old Collegians Football Club Inc. Est. 1931 (known as SPOCFC or St Pat's Football Club) is an Australian rules football club in Prospect Vale, Tasmania, and competes in the Northern Tasmanian Football Association.

The mascot for the "Saints" is "the Champ" a footballer on the run with ball under the arm and the other arm outstretched, dressed in his football gear with a halo above his head.

Prior to the formation of the Northern Tasmanian Football Association the club competed in the Tasmanian Amateur Football League.

The club as the name suggests was originally formed as an offshoot for past school boys to continue playing organised sport.

The club continues to foster a relationship with St Patrick's College, but not all players are recruited from the school.

The club is situated in Prospect Vale on a lower oval of the College's grounds.

The oval has adequate lighting facilities to host night games.

The oval is unique in that it has a very sandy soil and is very difficult for grass to grow at the top end of the oval. The oval has been used as a conceptual model for urban salinity in Launceston, Tasmania.

Premierships
Seniors
Tasmanian Amateur Football League (TAFL): 1931, 1932, 1935, 1936
TAFL Northern Division (TAFLND): 1948, 1954, 1955, 1956, 1984
NTFA Division Two: 1996, 1999 (undefeated), 2002, 2004
TAFL State Championship (Conder Shield): 1932, 1954
Runners Up: 1968, 1970, 1971, 1973, 1979, 2014, 2015

Reserves 
NTFA Division Two 1996, 1998, 1999 (undefeated), 2002, 2005, 2014, 2015 (undefeated)

Competition best and fairest
TAFL best and fairest: H. McIntee 1937
Max Allen Cup: D. Hay 1950; J. Cunningham 1952; A. Neville 1954, 1955, 1956; K. Hudson 1969
NTFA Division Two best and fairest: Jason Matthews 2001
NTFA Division Two reserves best and fairest: Graeme Taylor 1996 Ben House 2000

References

External links
Sporting Pulse

Australian rules football clubs in Tasmania
1931 establishments in Australia
Australian rules football clubs established in 1931